Penimepicycline (INN, also known as mepicycline penicillinate) is an antibiotic. It is the phenoxymethylpenicillinate salt of the tetracycline antibiotic pipacycline (mepicycline).

References

Penicillins
Combination antibiotics
Tetracycline antibiotics